In functional analysis, a unitary operator is a surjective bounded operator on a Hilbert space that preserves the inner product. Unitary operators are usually taken as operating on a Hilbert space, but the same notion serves to define the concept of isomorphism between Hilbert spaces.

A unitary element is a generalization of a unitary operator. In a unital algebra, an element  of the algebra is called a unitary element if ,
where  is the identity element.

Definition 
Definition 1.

The weaker condition  defines an isometry. The other condition, defines a coisometry. Thus a unitary operator is a bounded linear operator which is both an isometry and a coisometry, or, equivalently, a surjective isometry.

An equivalent definition is the following:

Definition 2. A unitary operator is a bounded linear operator  on a Hilbert space  for which the following hold:
 is surjective, and
 preserves the inner product of the Hilbert space, .

The notion of isomorphism in the category of Hilbert spaces is captured if domain and range are allowed to differ in this definition. Isometries preserve Cauchy sequences, hence the completeness property of Hilbert spaces is preserved

The following, seemingly weaker, definition is also equivalent:

Definition 3. A unitary operator is a bounded linear operator  on a Hilbert space  for which the following hold:
 preserves the inner product of the Hilbert space, .

To see that Definitions 1 & 3 are equivalent, notice that  preserving the inner product implies  is an isometry (thus, a bounded linear operator). The fact that  has dense range ensures it has a bounded inverse . It is clear that .

Thus, unitary operators are just automorphisms of Hilbert spaces, i.e., they preserve the structure (the linear space structure, the inner product, and hence the topology) of the space on which they act.

Examples
 The identity function is trivially a unitary operator.
Rotations do not change the length of a vector or the angle between two vectors.
The corresponding group, which, as a set, is the circle, is called .
 More generally, unitary matrices are precisely the unitary operators on finite-dimensional Hilbert spaces, so the notion of a unitary operator is a generalization of the notion of a unitary matrix. Orthogonal matrices are the special case of unitary matrices in which all entries are real.
 The bilateral shift on the sequence space  indexed by the integers is unitary. In general, any operator in a Hilbert space which acts by permuting an orthonormal basis is unitary. In the finite dimensional case, such operators are the permutation matrices.
 The unilateral shift (right shift) is an isometry; its conjugate (left shift) is a coisometry.
 The Fourier operator is a unitary operator, i.e. the operator which performs the Fourier transform (with proper normalization). This follows from Parseval's theorem.
 Unitary operators are used in unitary representations.
 Quantum logic gates are unitary operators. Not all gates are Hermitian.

Linearity
The linearity requirement in the definition of a unitary operator can be dropped without changing the meaning because it can be derived from linearity and positive-definiteness of the scalar product:

Analogously you obtain

Properties
 The spectrum of a unitary operator  lies on the unit circle. That is, for any complex number  in the spectrum, one has . This can be seen as a consequence of the spectral theorem for normal operators. Now  implies , -a.e.
 A linear map is unitary if it is surjective and isometric. (Use Polarization identity to show the only if part.)

See also

Footnotes

References
 

 

 

 

Operator theory
Unitary operators
Linear operators